Kenzo Yashima (6 April 1902 – 17 October 1979) was a Japanese long-distance runner. He competed in the marathon at the 1920 Summer Olympics.

References

External links
 

1902 births
1979 deaths
Athletes (track and field) at the 1920 Summer Olympics
Japanese male long-distance runners
Japanese male marathon runners
Olympic athletes of Japan